New Edubiase United Football Club are a Ghanaian professional association football club, based in New Edubiase and currently a member of the Ghana Premier League.

Current squad

References

External links
Yen.com.gh